Sake is a town in south-eastern Rwanda in Ngoma District.

Transport 

It lies on a possible route for the Rwanda Railway under consideration in 2009.

See also 

 Railway stations in Rwanda

References 

Populated places in Rwanda